George Nicholas Zenovich  (April 29, 1922 – September 25, 2013) was an American politician and jurist, as well as a longtime Democrat.

Career 
Elected as Assemblyman for the 32nd District, Zenovich served in the California State Assembly from 1963 to 1971, where he acted as  Majority Floor Leader and Chairman of the Democratic Caucus.  Representing the 16th District, Zenovich then served in the California State Senate from 1971 to 1979, where he was responsible for legislating the California Housing Finance Agency. He also carried the 1975 legislation creating the Arts Council and the Agricultural Labor Relations Board. As vice chairman of the Senate Judiciary Committee, he was involved in major legislation, leading him to want a career on the bench.  From 1979 -1984, Zenovich served as Justice of the 5th District in the California Courts of Appeal. The Fifth District Court of Appeal Courthouse in Fresno is named after him. After leaving the bench, Zenovich became a lobbyist in Sacramento.

Background 
Zenovich was born in Fresno, California, to parents Nicholas and Eva, who were Serb immigrants to the United States from Yugoslavia.  While in high school and college, he was elected student body president.  During World War II, Zenovich served in the United States Army as
an Army Air Force Japanese Code Interceptor Operator. He studied at California State University, Fresno and then at Southwestern Law School.  In 1947, he was admitted to the California Bar and began working as an attorney in 1953.  Active in the Democratic party's Central Committee, he ran the John F. Kennedy campaign in California's Central Valley and President County .

Zenovich was married to Vera "Kika" Sarenac, who was born in the former Yugoslavia. They have two daughters. Ninon Zenovich (aka Ninon Aprea) is an actress and Marina Zenovich is a documentary film director. Zenovich died in Fresno, California at the age of 91.

References

External links
Official Court biography

1922 births
2013 deaths
People from Fresno, California
California State University, Fresno alumni
Southwestern Law School alumni
Judges of the California Courts of Appeal
Democratic Party California state senators
Democratic Party members of the California State Assembly
United States Army Air Forces personnel of World War II
American people of Serbian descent
United States Army Air Forces soldiers
20th-century American judges